Green Ice is a 1981 British adventure film starring Ryan O'Neal. It was also released under the name Operation Green Ice.

Plot
A down on his luck engineer gets involved in an adventure with a mysterious woman and an emerald magnate.

Cast
 Ryan O'Neal as Joseph Wiley
 Anne Archer as Lillian Holbrook
 Omar Sharif as Meno Argenti
 John Larroquette as Claude
 Michael Sheard as Jaap
 Philip Stone as Kellerman

Production

Development
The film was based on a novel by Gerald Browne, best known for writing 11 Harrowhouse. Browne was fascinated by emeralds and spent extensive time in Colombia researching the book, which was published in 1978.

In July 1978 David Niven Jr, who had just made Escape to Athena, arrived in Hollywood to commence pre production on the film adaptation. Browne was saying Richard Burton would star in the lead but Niven Jr said this was not true and that there was not even a script.

In October 1978 ITC announced the film was part of a slate of movies that also included Raise the Titanic, The Lone Ranger, The Chinese Bandit, Eleanor Roosevelt's Niggers, The Golden Gate, The Gemini Contenders, Trans-Siberian Express, and The Scarletti Inheritance. (Only Green Ice and the first two would be made.)

The original director was Anthony Simmons, best known for Black Joy (1977) which had been backed by ITC.  Simmons says he got the job on the back of the critical success of On Giant's Shoulders (1979). Simmons says the original novel "was a huge book with about five different stories, any one of which would have been perfect action thriller, and the producers wanted to do the section set in Bolivia. It had all the hallmarks of disaster and I should never have touched it."

Simmons says the budget was going to be £7 million and the writer was to be Troy Kennedy Martin. He says he worked on the script and the "set action pieces" for over a year and ITC "spent a million dollars looking for locations first in Spain, then in Mexico."

Anne Archer was cast on the back of her performance in Raise the Titanic. Simmons says "Every artist for the part of the woman was turned down for being too “old”, (she was meant to be in her early twenties) but it turned out Lew Grade had already contracted Ann Archer, a good actress in her mid thirties. "

Shooting
The movie was set in Colombia but shot on location in Mexico as it was felt that country was safer. The unit was mostly based out of the town of Cuernavaca.

Simmons says a lot of the film "was shot in and around the hotel and a large chunk taken back to the studio in the UK" and the opening sequence was shot  in the hotel gardens. He also says Ryan O'Neal "found he couldn’t work with" Anne Archer as "they both had very different ideas about what kind of film we were making. Then I was told either me or the producer had to go and they were going to get Franklin Schaffner to shoot it. So I left the production by ‘artistic disagreement’. I was paid 100 per cent of my fee but it took me a couple of years to live it down." Simmons left the project during filming and was replaced by Ernest Day, the second unit director.

The film was financed by Lew Grade who called it "quite a nice little film, but in the end, too much like a TV movie."

O'Neal almost drowned while filming a scene in the ocean in Las Hadas and he had to be rescued by stuntman Vic Armstrong.

Grade said he found O'Neal "charming and helpful" during the making of the movie. Sharif said he had "a nice secondary part, rather flash, with plenty of time off." The schedule was arranged so Sharif could periodically return to Europe to supervise his casinos.

Simmons says "We couldn’t go above a certain budget. But the rumour is that the film in the end cost nearly double its original budget. Anyway, it was an experience. It was my first time going into a Hollywood-style production and that kind of contract."

Music

The soundtrack was recorded by Bill Wyman and released as the album Green Ice. The soundtrack contains 18 original songs.

Reception
The film was distributed in the US by AFD, the newly formed distribution arm of ITC and EMI Films.

Critical
The Observer called it "a disaster".

Box Office
In June 1981 it was the fifth most popular movie then in release at the British box office.

Anne Archer later got Ernest Day to direct a film she starred in and helped produce, Waltz Across Texas.

See also
High Risk (1981)
Romancing the Stone (1984)
Florida Straits (1986)

References

External links

Green Ice at TCMDB
Green Ice at Letter
Review of film at DVD Talk

1981 films
1980s adventure films
1980s heist films
British adventure films
British heist films
Films set in Colombia
Films set in Mexico
ITC Entertainment films
Films with screenplays by Edward Anhalt
1980s English-language films
1980s British films